George Malcolm (20 June 1889 – 1965) was an English professional footballer who played as a left half in the Football League for Fulham, Middlesbrough, Darlington, Durham City and in the Southern League for Plymouth Argyle.

Personal life 
In 1934, Malcolm was employed at ICI's Billingham Manufacturing Plant, when an escape of ammonia gas resulted in the deaths of 11 workers. In his testimony at the inquest of one victim, Malcolm described how he had to jump for his life, while the deceased was working higher up the structure and could not do so.

Career statistics

References 

1889 births
1965 deaths
People from Thornaby-on-Tees
Footballers from County Durham
Footballers from Yorkshire
English footballers
Association football wing halves
Darlington St Augustine's F.C. players
Fulham F.C. players
Plymouth Argyle F.C. players
Middlesbrough F.C. players
Darlington F.C. players
Durham City A.F.C. players
English Football League players
Southern Football League players
Brentford F.C. wartime guest players